Anthoor is a municipality in the Kannur district of the North Malabar region in the Indian state of Kerala. Anthoor is located roughly 15 km from the Kannur City, and 7 km from Taliparamba town.

Geography
Almost half of Anthoor's border is surrounded by two scenic rivers, the Valapattanam Puzha and the Kuttikkol Puzha. The backwaters at Vellikkeel Eco Tourism Park are a tourist spot.

Anthoor shares borders with Taliparamba and Kurumathur to the north, Kalliasseri and Pappinisseri to the south, Kannapuram to the west, and Mayyil, Kolachery, and Narath to the east.

Etymology
The name Anthoor means "large village." Due to its large size, the town was split into two villages, Anthoor and Morazha. The hill of Anthoor has been mentioned in many Theyyam folk songs and Thottam Pattu (തോറ്റം പാട്ട്).

History
Anthoor was previously under Kolathiri rule. Later, Tipu Sultan adjoined this area as part of the Kingdom of Mysore. During British Raj, the kingdom was under Chirakkal Taluk of Malabar District in the Madras Presidency. After the formation of the Kerala State, this area was made a panchayat in the Cannanore District. Later, the Anthoor Panchayat was merged with the Taliparambu Municipality upon the latter's formation. Presently, Anthoor is an independent municipality of Kannur District of Kerala State.

Demographics
According to the 2011 India Census, Anthoor had a population of 28,218 with 12,527 men and 15,691 women.

Anthoor was a panchayath consisting of two small villages, Morazha and Anthoor. In 1990, when the government of Kerala announced new municipalities, Anthoor Panchayat was merged with Taliparamba to form the new Municipality of Taliparamba. Later, in 2015, the government separated Anthoor from Taliparamba and made it an independent municipality. Anthoor is a municipality by its population and density, but maintains with the characteristics of a village. The town is located on NH-66, situated near Taliparamba in the Kannur District of the North Malabar region in Kerala.

Administration
 District: Kannur
 Taluk/Tehsil: Taliparamba
 Block: Taliparamba
 Assembly constituency: Taliparamba
 Lok Sabha constituency : Kannur
 Police Station: Taliparamba
 Nearest Railway Station: Kannapuram Pappinisseri

Post offices
Anchampeedika-670331
Morazha-670331
Kanool-670562
Parassinikkadavu-670563
Nanicherry-670564
Kannur University Campus-670567

Tourism 
 Vellikkeel Eco Tourism Park
 Vismaya Infotainment Park
 Parassinikkadavu Snake Park

Notable people
 M.V. Govindan - Politician

Theyyam
 Raktha Chamundi at Edappara Chamundeswari Temple, Panthottam
 Anthur Puthiya Bhagawati Temple
 Neeliyar Kottam
 ParassiniMatappura Sreemuthappan Temple

Institutions
 Institute of Co-operative Management, Parassinikkadavu
 Parrasianikkadavu Ayurveda Medical College
 Mangattuparambu Doordarshan Station
 Govt Engineering College, Kannur
 National Institute of Fashion Technology, Kannur
 Kendriya Vidyalaya Keltron Nagar
 Kerala Clays and Ceramic Products Limited
 Kannur University Main Campus

Religious institutions
 Muthappan Temple

Governance
Anthoor is always 100% CPIM Supporting Area. 14 out 28 of the Municipal Councillors are elected unopposed.

Municipal Wards
Anthoor Municipality is composed of following 28 wards:

Transport
The National Highway-66 passes through the Dharmashala junction. Mangalore and Mumbai can be accessed on the northern side, and Cochin and Thiruvananthapuram can be accessed on the southern side. The nearest railway stations are Kannapuram and Kannur on the Mangalore-Palakkad line. There are airports at Kannur International Airport, Mangaluru Airport and Calicut International Airport.

References

Villages near Dharmashala, Kannur
Cities and towns in Kannur district